Sheila Piercey (18 March 1919 – 14 August 2005) was a South African tennis player. She was also known under her married name Sheila Piercey-Summers.

Piercey was born in Johannesburg, South Africa. With her compatriot Eric Sturgess, she won three mixed doubles titles: at the French Open in 1947 and 1949 and at Wimbledon in 1949.

In 1947, she became the first South African woman to reach a Wimbledon semifinal in the singles event. She lost the match in straight sets to top-seeded and eventual champion Margaret Osborne. Two years later, in 1949, she again reached the semifinals of the French Championships and again lost to Osborne in straight sets.

Summers won the South African Championships singles title in 1948, 1949 and 1951 and was runner–up in 1939, 1940 and 1947. In August 1947, she won the singles title at the International Swiss Championships at Lausann, defeating Doris Hart in the final in three sets.

After her playing career, she coached the South African Federation Cup team.

Grand Slam finals

Mixed doubles (3 titles)

References

1919 births
2005 deaths
Tennis players from Johannesburg
South African female tennis players
French Championships (tennis) champions
Wimbledon champions (pre-Open Era)
Grand Slam (tennis) champions in mixed doubles
White South African people